Bifidobacterium dentium is a species of bacteria in the genus Bifidobacterium, branched anaerobic bacteria from the Bifidobacteriaceae family.

B. dentium is a source of anaerobic infections, and is also tracked in polluted water to trace the source of fecal contamination. Scientists have shown that B. dentium can cause tooth decay in humans. Due to its high tolerance of the acidic environments reached by the human mouth (pH 4.5), B. dentium can sustain growth in the oral cavities, cause harm to the teeth, and break down sugars.

B. dentium has been identified by researchers at Baylor College of Medicine and Texas Children's Hospital as producing a neurotransmitter that may play a role in preventing or treating inflammatory bowel diseases such as Crohn's disease.

B. dentium colonizes the intestinal mucus layer, where it has been found to produce acetate. In addition, B. dentium produces the neurotransmitter GABA and other products which regulate intestinal goblet cells. In addition, B. dentium may be involved in the development of mucin.

References

External links
Type strain of Bifidobacterium dentium at BacDive -  the Bacterial Diversity Metadatabase

Bifidobacteriales
Bacteria described in 1974